Rio Claro (Portuguese and Spanish for "clear river" or "clean river") may refer to:

Cities
Rio Claro, Trinidad and Tobago, the largest town in southeastern Trinidad and Tobago
Rio Claro, Rio de Janeiro, a Brazilian municipality in the state of Rio de Janeiro
Rio Claro, São Paulo, a Brazilian municipality in the state of São Paulo
Rio Claro, Costa Rica, a small Costa Rican city located in the province of Puntarenas in the southwestern region of the country, near the border with Panama

Rivers

Argentina 
 3 rivers

Bolivia 
 Claro River (Bolivia)

Brazil 
 19 rivers including:
 Claro River (Apucaraninha River)
 Claro River (Araguaia River)
 Claro River (Iguazu River)
 Claro River (Ivaí River)
 Claro River (lower Tietê River)
 Claro River (Minas Gerais)
 Claro River (Paranaíba River)
 Claro River (Pardo River)
 Claro River (Preto River)
 Claro River (upper Tietê River)

Chile 
There are 13 rivers named Rio Claro (Claro River) in Chile, including: 
 Claro River (Elqui) tributary of the Elqui River in the Coquimbo Region
 Claro River (Tinguiririca) a tributary of the Tinguiririca River in the O'Higgins Region
 Claro River (Teno) a tributary of the Teno River in the Maule Region
 Claro River (Maule) a tributary of the Maule River in the Maule Region
 Claro River (Laja) a tributary of the Laja River in the Bío-Bío Region

Colombia 
 8 rivers including:
 Rio Claro, a Colombian river located in Antioquia Department

Costa Rica 
 Claro River (Costa Rica)

Ecuador 
 Claro River (Ecuador)

Honduras 
 Claro River (Honduras)

Mexico 
 Claro River (Mexico)

Panama 
 Claro River (Panama)

Spain 
 Claro River (Spain)

Trinidad and Tobago 
 Claro River (Trinidad and Tobago)

Venezuela
 10 rivers

Other places

Chile
 Río Claro, a commune of the Talca Province, Maule Region

Sports
 Rio Claro Futebol Clube, a Brazilian football (soccer) club